Conor Ryan is an Irish former hurler who played at midfield for the Clare senior team. At club level Ryan played with Cratloe.

He is the older brother of Clare hurler Diarmuid Ryan.

Career
Ryan made his Senior Championship debut on 2 June 2013 against Waterford, starting in midfield in a 2-20 to 1-15 victory.
Ryan was named as the Man of the Match in the drawn 2013 All-Ireland Senior Hurling Championship Final against Cork.

Ryan missed the 2017 season on medical advice but was part of the analytics support team for the year.

Ryan was forced to retire from hurling in 2018 due to health reasons.

Honours

Team
Clare
All-Ireland Senior Hurling Championship (1) : 2013
All-Ireland Under-21 Hurling Championship (1) : 2012
Munster Under-21 Hurling Championship (1) : 2012

Cratloe
Clare Senior Hurling Championship (2) : 2009, 2014
Clare Senior Football Championship (2): 2013, 2014

Individual
 GAA-GPA All-Star Award (1): 2013
 All-Ireland Senior Hurling Championship Final Man of the Match (1): 2013 (Draw)

References

Living people
Cratloe hurlers
Clare inter-county hurlers
1991 births
People educated at Ardscoil Rís, Limerick